Halanaerobium is a Gram-negative, non-endospore-forming, rod-shaped, and strictly anaerobic genus of bacteria from the family Halanaerobiaceae.

Phylogeny
The currently accepted taxonomy is based on the List of Prokaryotic names with Standing in Nomenclature (LPSN) and National Center for Biotechnology Information (NCBI).

See also
 List of bacterial orders
 List of bacteria genera

References

Clostridia
Bacteria genera
Taxa described in 1984